Hymenorchis is a genus of flowering plants from the orchid family, Orchidaceae. It is native to Malaysia, Indonesia, Philippines, New Guinea and New Caledonia.

Species accepted as of June 2014

Hymenorchis brassii Ormerod - Papua New Guinea
Hymenorchis caulina Schltr. - New Guinea
Hymenorchis foliosa Schltr. - New Guinea
Hymenorchis glomeroides J.J.Sm. - New Guinea
Hymenorchis javanica (Teijsm. & Binn.) Schltr. - Pahang, Java
Hymenorchis kaniensis Schltr. - New Guinea
Hymenorchis nannodes Schltr. - New Guinea
Hymenorchis saccata Schltr.  - New Guinea
Hymenorchis serrata Schltr.  - New Guinea
Hymenorchis serrulata (N.Hallé) Garay - New Caledonia
Hymenorchis tanii Schuit. & de Vogel - Papua New Guinea
Hymenorchis vanoverberghii (Ames) Garay - Philippines

See also
 List of Orchidaceae genera

References 

 Pridgeon, A.M., Cribb, P.J., Chase, M.A. & Rasmussen, F. eds. (1999). Genera Orchidacearum 1. Oxford Univ. Press.
 Pridgeon, A.M., Cribb, P.J., Chase, M.A. & Rasmussen, F. eds. (2001). Genera Orchidacearum 2. Oxford Univ. Press.
 Pridgeon, A.M., Cribb, P.J., Chase, M.A. & Rasmussen, F. eds. (2003). Genera Orchidacearum 3. Oxford Univ. Press
 Berg Pana, H. 2005. Handbuch der Orchideen-Namen. Dictionary of Orchid Names. Dizionario dei nomi delle orchidee. Ulmer, Stuttgart

External links 

Vandeae genera
Aeridinae